Shepherd's Bush Market is a street market in Shepherd's Bush, London. The market is located on the east side of the railway viaduct for the Hammersmith and City Tube line, and is bordered on the north side by the Uxbridge Road, and on the south by the Goldhawk Road.

History
The market dates back to the early part of the twentieth century, when the present layout of the Hammersmith and City tube line was fixed. The market opened for business in around 1914, with shops lining the railway viaduct. It was closed briefly in 1915 to make way for the billeted troops but was given a new lease of life in 1918 as soldiers returning from the Western Front were offered stalls to help restart their lives.

The market today
Individual market vendors sell a wide variety of goods today, including fresh produce, fabrics, household goods and clothing. There are also a number of cafes and restaurants selling falafel, Ethiopian food, Chinese food and pizza.

In September 2020, Yoo Capital became the majority owners of Shepherd's Bush Market.

Information 
The market, conveniently located between Shepherd's Bush Market underground station and Goldhawk Road station, is open Monday to Saturday from 8am - 6pm and will be open from 10am to 4pm on Sundays from June–September 2021. Individual vendor opening times may vary.

See also
History of Shepherd's Bush
List of markets in London
Shepherd's Bush
Shepherd's Bush Market tube station

References
 Denny, Barbara, Hammersmith and Shepherd's Bush Past, Historical Publications Ltd, London (1995),

Notes

External links
Official Site of Shepherd's Bush Market Retrieved June 2021
Culture Trip Shepherd's Bush  Retrieved June 2021
Shepherd's Bush Market at Londonist Retrieved June 2021
Shepherd's Bush Market Tenants' Association  website Retrieved August 2015

Retail markets in London
Buildings and structures in the London Borough of Hammersmith and Fulham
Tourist attractions in the London Borough of Hammersmith and Fulham
Market